Hoeflea  is a genus of Gram-negative, strictly aerobic, oxidase- and catalase-positive, non-spore-forming, rod-shaped bacteria.

References

Rhizobiaceae
Bacteria genera